Robert Arthur Fisher (August 27, 1916 – May 1983) was an American football offensive lineman in the National Football League for the Washington Redskins.  He played college football at the University of Southern California.

1916 births
1983 deaths
Players of American football from Los Angeles
American football offensive guards
American football offensive tackles
USC Trojans football players
Washington Redskins players